Chicago is the most populous city in the U.S. state of Illinois and the third most populous in the United States after New York City and Los Angeles. With a population of 2,746,388 in the 2020 census, it is also the most populous city in the Midwest. As the seat of Cook County (the second-most populous U.S. county), the city is the center of the Chicago metropolitan area, one of the largest in the world.

On the shore of Lake Michigan, Chicago was incorporated as a city in 1837 near a portage between the Great Lakes and the Mississippi River watershed. It grew rapidly in the mid-19th century; by 1860, Chicago was the youngest U.S. city to exceed a population of 100,000. The Great Chicago Fire in 1871 destroyed several square miles and left more than 100,000 homeless, but Chicago's population continued to grow to 503,000 by 1880 and then doubled to more than a million within the decade. The construction boom accelerated population growth throughout the following decades, and by 1900, less than 30 years after the fire, Chicago was the fifth-largest city in the world. Chicago made noted contributions to urban planning and zoning standards, including new construction styles (such as Chicago School architecture, the development of the City Beautiful Movement, and the steel-framed skyscraper).

Chicago is an international hub for finance, culture, commerce, industry, education, technology, telecommunications, and transportation. It is the site of the creation of the first standardized futures contracts, issued by the Chicago Board of Trade, which today is part of the largest and most diverse derivatives market in the world, generating 20% of all volume in commodities and financial futures alone. O'Hare International Airport is routinely ranked among the world's top six busiest airports according to tracked data by the Airports Council International. The region also has the largest number of federal highways and is the nation's railroad hub. The Chicago area has one of the highest gross domestic products (GDP) in the world, generating $689 billion in 2018. The economy of Chicago is diverse, with no single industry employing more than 14% of the workforce. It is home to several Fortune 500 companies, including Archer-Daniels-Midland, Conagra Brands, Exelon, JLL, Kraft Heinz, McDonald's, Mondelez International, Motorola Solutions, Sears, and United Airlines Holdings.

Chicago's 58 million tourist visitors in 2018 set a new record. Landmarks in the city include Millennium Park, Navy Pier, the Magnificent Mile, Art Institute of Chicago, Museum Campus, Willis (Sears) Tower, Grant Park, Museum of Science and Industry, and Lincoln Park Zoo. Chicago is also home to the Barack Obama Presidential Center being built in Hyde Park on the city's South Side. Chicago's culture includes the visual arts, literature, film, theater, comedy (especially improvisational comedy), food, dance (including modern dance and jazz troupes and the Joffrey Ballet), and music (particularly jazz, blues, soul, hip-hop, gospel, and electronic dance music, including house music). Chicago is also the location of the Chicago Symphony Orchestra and the Lyric Opera of Chicago. Of the area's colleges and universities, the University of Chicago, Northwestern University, and the University of Illinois Chicago are classified as "highest research" doctoral universities. Chicago has professional sports teams in each of the major professional leagues, including two Major League Baseball teams.

Etymology and nicknames

The name Chicago is derived from a French rendering of the indigenous Miami-Illinois word  for a wild relative of the onion; it is known to botanists as Allium tricoccum and known more commonly as "ramps". The first known reference to the site of the current city of Chicago as "" was by Robert de LaSalle around 1679 in a memoir. Henri Joutel, in his journal of 1688, noted that the eponymous wild "garlic" grew profusely in the area. According to his diary of late September 1687:

The city has had several nicknames throughout its history, such as the Windy City, Chi-Town, Second City, and City of the Big Shoulders.

History

Beginnings 
In the mid-18th century, the area was inhabited by the Potawatomi, a Native American tribe who had succeeded the Miami and Sauk and Fox peoples in this region.

 

The first known non-indigenous permanent settler in Chicago was trader Jean Baptiste Point du Sable. Du Sable was of African descent, perhaps born in the French colony of Saint-Domingue (Haiti), and established the settlement in the 1780s. He is commonly known as the "Founder of Chicago".

In 1795, following the victory of the new United States in the Northwest Indian War, an area that was to be part of Chicago was turned over to the US for a military post by native tribes in accordance with the Treaty of Greenville. In 1803, the U.S. Army constructed Fort Dearborn, which was destroyed during the War of 1812 in the Battle of Fort Dearborn by the Potawatomi before being later rebuilt.

After the War of 1812, the Ottawa, Ojibwe, and Potawatomi tribes ceded additional land to the United States in the 1816 Treaty of St. Louis. The Potawatomi were forcibly removed from their land after the 1833 Treaty of Chicago and sent west of the Mississippi River as part of the federal policy of Indian removal.

19th century

On August 12, 1833, the Town of Chicago was organized with a population of about 200. Within seven years it grew to more than 6,000 people. On June 15, 1835, the first public land sales began with Edmund Dick Taylor as Receiver of Public Monies. The City of Chicago was incorporated on Saturday, March 4, 1837, and for several decades was the world's fastest-growing city.

As the site of the Chicago Portage, the city became an important transportation hub between the eastern and western United States. Chicago's first railway, Galena and Chicago Union Railroad, and the Illinois and Michigan Canal opened in 1848. The canal allowed steamboats and sailing ships on the Great Lakes to connect to the Mississippi River.

A flourishing economy brought residents from rural communities and immigrants from abroad. Manufacturing and retail and finance sectors became dominant, influencing the American economy. The Chicago Board of Trade (established 1848) listed the first-ever standardized "exchange-traded" forward contracts, which were called futures contracts.

In the 1850s, Chicago gained national political prominence as the home of Senator Stephen Douglas, the champion of the Kansas–Nebraska Act and the "popular sovereignty" approach to the issue of the spread of slavery. These issues also helped propel another Illinoisan, Abraham Lincoln, to the national stage. Lincoln was nominated in Chicago for US president at the 1860 Republican National Convention, which was held in a purpose-built auditorium called, the Wigwam. He defeated Douglas in the general election, and this set the stage for the American Civil War.

To accommodate rapid population growth and demand for better sanitation, the city improved its infrastructure. In February 1856, Chicago's Common Council approved Chesbrough's plan to build the United States' first comprehensive sewerage system. The project raised much of central Chicago to a new grade with the use of jackscrews for raising buildings. While elevating Chicago, and at first improving the city's health, the untreated sewage and industrial waste now flowed into the Chicago River, and subsequently into Lake Michigan, polluting the city's primary freshwater source.

The city responded by tunneling  out into Lake Michigan to newly built water cribs. In 1900, the problem of sewage contamination was largely resolved when the city completed a major engineering feat. It reversed the flow of the Chicago River so that the water flowed away from Lake Michigan rather than into it. This project began with the construction and improvement of the Illinois and Michigan Canal, and was completed with the Chicago Sanitary and Ship Canal that connects to the Illinois River, which flows into the Mississippi River.

Much of the city, including railroads and stockyards, survived intact, and from the ruins of the previous wooden structures arose more modern constructions of steel and stone. These set a precedent for worldwide construction. During its rebuilding period, Chicago constructed the world's first skyscraper in 1885, using steel-skeleton construction.

The city grew significantly in size and population by incorporating many neighboring townships between 1851 and 1920, with the largest annexation happening in 1889, with five townships joining the city, including the Hyde Park Township, which now comprises most of the South Side of Chicago and the far southeast of Chicago, and the Jefferson Township, which now makes up most of Chicago's Northwest Side. The desire to join the city was driven by municipal services that the city could provide its residents.

Chicago's flourishing economy attracted huge numbers of new immigrants from Europe and migrants from the Eastern United States. Of the total population in 1900, more than 77% were either foreign-born or born in the United States of foreign parentage. Germans, Irish, Poles, Swedes, and Czechs made up nearly two-thirds of the foreign-born population (by 1900, whites were 98.1% of the city's population).

Labor conflicts followed the industrial boom and the rapid expansion of the labor pool, including the Haymarket affair on May 4, 1886, and in 1894 the Pullman Strike. Anarchist and socialist groups played prominent roles in creating very large and highly organized labor actions. Concern for social problems among Chicago's immigrant poor led Jane Addams and Ellen Gates Starr to found Hull House in 1889. Programs that were developed there became a model for the new field of social work.

During the 1870s and 1880s, Chicago attained national stature as the leader in the movement to improve public health. City laws and later, state laws that upgraded standards for the medical profession and fought urban epidemics of cholera, smallpox, and yellow fever were both passed and enforced. These laws became templates for public health reform in other cities and states.

The city established many large, well-landscaped municipal parks, which also included public sanitation facilities. The chief advocate for improving public health in Chicago was Dr. John H. Rauch, M.D. Rauch established a plan for Chicago's park system in 1866. He created Lincoln Park by closing a cemetery filled with shallow graves, and in 1867, in response to an outbreak of cholera he helped establish a new Chicago Board of Health. Ten years later, he became the secretary and then the president of the first Illinois State Board of Health, which carried out most of its activities in Chicago.

In the 1800s, Chicago became the nation's railroad hub, and by 1910 over 20 railroads operated passenger service out of six different downtown terminals. In 1883, Chicago's railway managers needed a general time convention, so they developed the standardized system of North American time zones. This system for telling time spread throughout the continent.

In 1893, Chicago hosted the World's Columbian Exposition on former marshland at the present location of Jackson Park. The Exposition drew 27.5 million visitors, and is considered the most influential world's fair in history. The University of Chicago, formerly at another location, moved to the same South Side location in 1892. The term "midway" for a fair or carnival referred originally to the Midway Plaisance, a strip of park land that still runs through the University of Chicago campus and connects the Washington and Jackson Parks.

20th and 21st centuries

1900 to 1939

During World War I and the 1920s there was a major expansion in industry. The availability of jobs attracted African Americans from the Southern United States. Between 1910 and 1930, the African American population of Chicago increased dramatically, from 44,103 to 233,903. This Great Migration had an immense cultural impact, called the Chicago Black Renaissance, part of the New Negro Movement, in art, literature, and music. Continuing racial tensions and violence, such as the Chicago Race Riot of 1919, also occurred.

The ratification of the 18th amendment to the Constitution in 1919 made the production and sale (including exportation) of alcoholic beverages illegal in the United States. This ushered in the beginning of what is known as the Gangster Era, a time that roughly spans from 1919 until 1933 when Prohibition was repealed. The 1920s saw gangsters, including Al Capone, Dion O'Banion, Bugs Moran and Tony Accardo battle law enforcement and each other on the streets of Chicago during the Prohibition era. Chicago was the location of the infamous St. Valentine's Day Massacre in 1929, when Al Capone sent men to gun down members of a rival gang, North Side, led by Bugs Moran.

Chicago was the first American city to have a homosexual-rights organization. The organization, formed in 1924, was called the Society for Human Rights. It produced the first American publication for homosexuals, Friendship and Freedom. Police and political pressure caused the organization to disband.

The Great Depression brought unprecedented suffering to Chicago, in no small part due to the city's heavy reliance on heavy industry. Notably, industrial areas on the south side and neighborhoods lining both branches of the Chicago River were devastated; by 1933 over 50% of industrial jobs in the city had been lost, and unemployment rates amongst blacks and Mexicans in the city were over 40%. The Republican political machine in Chicago was utterly destroyed by the economic crisis, and every mayor since 1931 has been a Democrat.

From 1928 to 1933, the city witnessed a tax revolt, and the city was unable to meet payroll or provide relief efforts. The fiscal crisis was resolved by 1933, and at the same time, federal relief funding began to flow into Chicago. Chicago was also a hotbed of labor activism, with Unemployed Councils contributing heavily in the early depression to create solidarity for the poor and demand relief, these organizations were created by socialist and communist groups. By 1935 the Workers Alliance of America begun organizing the poor, workers, the unemployed. In the spring of 1937 Republic Steel Works witnessed the Memorial Day massacre of 1937 in the neighborhood of East Side.

In 1933, Chicago Mayor Anton Cermak was fatally wounded in Miami, Florida, during a failed assassination attempt on President-elect Franklin D. Roosevelt. In 1933 and 1934, the city celebrated its centennial by hosting the Century of Progress International Exposition World's Fair. The theme of the fair was technological innovation over the century since Chicago's founding.

1940 to 1979

During World War II, the city of Chicago alone produced more steel than the United Kingdom every year from 1939 – 1945, and more than Nazi Germany from 1943 – 1945.

The Great Migration, which had been on pause due to the Depression, resumed at an even faster pace in the second wave, as hundreds of thousands of blacks from the South arrived in the city to work in the steel mills, railroads, and shipping yards.

On December 2, 1942, physicist Enrico Fermi conducted the world's first controlled nuclear reaction at the University of Chicago as part of the top-secret Manhattan Project. This led to the creation of the atomic bomb by the United States, which it used in World War II in 1945.

Mayor Richard J. Daley, a Democrat, was elected in 1955, in the era of machine politics. In 1956, the city conducted its last major expansion when it annexed the land under O'Hare airport, including a small portion of DuPage County.

By the 1960s, white residents in several neighborhoods left the city for the suburban areas – in many American cities, a process known as white flight – as Blacks continued to move beyond the Black Belt. While home loan discriminatory redlining against blacks continued, the real estate industry practiced what became known as blockbusting, completely changing the racial composition of whole neighborhoods. Structural changes in industry, such as globalization and job outsourcing, caused heavy job losses for lower-skilled workers. At its peak during the 1960s, some 250,000 workers were employed in the steel industry in Chicago, but the steel crisis of the 1970s and 1980s reduced this number to just 28,000 in 2015. In 1966, Martin Luther King Jr. and Albert Raby led the Chicago Freedom Movement, which culminated in agreements between Mayor Richard J. Daley and the movement leaders.

Two years later, the city hosted the tumultuous 1968 Democratic National Convention, which featured physical confrontations both inside and outside the convention hall, with anti-war protesters, journalists and bystanders being beaten by police. Major construction projects, including the Sears Tower (now known as the Willis Tower, which in 1974 became the world's tallest building), University of Illinois at Chicago, McCormick Place, and O'Hare International Airport, were undertaken during Richard J. Daley's tenure. In 1979, Jane Byrne, the city's first female mayor, was elected. She was notable for temporarily moving into the crime-ridden Cabrini-Green housing project and for leading Chicago's school system out of a financial crisis.

1980 to present
In 1983, Harold Washington became the first black mayor of Chicago. Washington's first term in office directed attention to poor and previously neglected minority neighborhoods. He was re‑elected in 1987 but died of a heart attack soon after. Washington was succeeded by 6th ward Alderman Eugene Sawyer, who was elected by the Chicago City Council and served until a special election.

Richard M. Daley, son of Richard J. Daley, was elected in 1989. His accomplishments included improvements to parks and creating incentives for sustainable development, as well as closing Meigs Field in the middle of the night and destroying the runways. After successfully running for re-election five times, and becoming Chicago's longest-serving mayor, Richard M. Daley declined to run for a seventh term.

In 1992, a construction accident near the Kinzie Street Bridge produced a breach connecting the Chicago River to a tunnel below, which was part of an abandoned freight tunnel system extending throughout the downtown Loop district. The area was shut down for three days and some buildings did not reopen for weeks; losses were estimated at $1.95 billion.

On February 23, 2011, former Illinois Congressman and White House Chief of Staff Rahm Emanuel won the mayoral election. Emanuel was sworn in as mayor on May 16, 2011, and won re-election in 2015. Lori Lightfoot, the city's first African American woman mayor and its first openly LGBTQ Mayor, was elected to succeed Emanuel as mayor in 2019. All three city-wide elective offices were held by women (and women of color) for the first time in Chicago history: in addition to Lightfoot, the City Clerk was Anna Valencia and City Treasurer, Melissa Conyears-Ervin.

Geography

Topography

Chicago is located in northeastern Illinois on the southwestern shores of freshwater Lake Michigan. It is the principal city in the Chicago metropolitan area, situated in both the Midwestern United States and the Great Lakes region. The city rests on a continental divide at the site of the Chicago Portage, connecting the Mississippi River and the Great Lakes watersheds. In addition to it lying beside Lake Michigan, two rivers—the Chicago River in downtown and the Calumet River in the industrial far South Side—flow either entirely or partially through the city.

Chicago's history and economy are closely tied to its proximity to Lake Michigan. While the Chicago River historically handled much of the region's waterborne cargo, today's huge lake freighters use the city's Lake Calumet Harbor on the South Side. The lake also provides another positive effect: moderating Chicago's climate, making waterfront neighborhoods slightly warmer in winter and cooler in summer.

When Chicago was founded in 1837, most of the early building was around the mouth of the Chicago River, as can be seen on a map of the city's original 58 blocks. The overall grade of the city's central, built-up areas is relatively consistent with the natural flatness of its overall natural geography, generally exhibiting only slight differentiation otherwise.

While the Chicago Loop is the central business district, Chicago is also a city of neighborhoods. Lake Shore Drive runs adjacent to a large portion of Chicago's waterfront. Some of the parks along the waterfront include Lincoln Park, Grant Park, Burnham Park, and Jackson Park. There are 24 public beaches across  of the waterfront. Landfill extends into portions of the lake providing space for Navy Pier, Northerly Island, the Museum Campus, and large portions of the McCormick Place Convention Center. Most of the city's high-rise commercial and residential buildings are close to the waterfront.

An informal name for the entire Chicago metropolitan area is "Chicagoland", which generally means the city and all its suburbs. The Chicago Tribune, which coined the term, includes the city of Chicago, the rest of Cook County, and eight nearby Illinois counties: Lake, McHenry, DuPage, Kane, Kendall, Grundy, Will and Kankakee, and three counties in Indiana: Lake, Porter and LaPorte. The Illinois Department of Tourism defines Chicagoland as Cook County without the city of Chicago, and only Lake, DuPage, Kane, and Will counties. The Chicagoland Chamber of Commerce defines it as all of Cook and DuPage, Kane, Lake, McHenry, and Will counties.

Communities

Major sections of the city include the central business district, called The Loop, and the North, South, and West Sides. The three sides of the city are represented on the Flag of Chicago by three horizontal white stripes. The North Side is the most-densely-populated residential section of the city, and many high-rises are located on this side of the city along the lakefront. The South Side is the largest section of the city, encompassing roughly 60% of the city's land area. The South Side contains most of the facilities of the Port of Chicago.

In the late-1920s, sociologists at the University of Chicago subdivided the city into 77 distinct community areas, which can further be subdivided into over 200 informally defined neighborhoods.

Streetscape

Chicago's streets were laid out in a street grid that grew from the city's original townsite plot, which was bounded by Lake Michigan on the east, North Avenue on the north, Wood Street on the west, and 22nd Street on the south. Streets following the Public Land Survey System section lines later became arterial streets in outlying sections. As new additions to the city were platted, city ordinance required them to be laid out with eight streets to the mile in one direction and sixteen in the other direction, about one street per 200 meters in one direction and one street per 100 meters in the other direction. The grid's regularity provided an efficient means of developing new real estate property. A scattering of diagonal streets, many of them originally Native American trails, also cross the city (Elston, Milwaukee, Ogden, Lincoln, etc.). Many additional diagonal streets were recommended in the Plan of Chicago, but only the extension of Ogden Avenue was ever constructed.

In 2016, Chicago was ranked the sixth-most walkable large city in the United States. Many of the city's residential streets have a wide patch of grass or trees between the street and the sidewalk itself. This helps to keep pedestrians on the sidewalk further away from the street traffic. Chicago's Western Avenue is the longest continuous urban street in the world. Other notable streets include Michigan Avenue, State Street, Oak, Rush, Clark Street, and Belmont Avenue. The City Beautiful movement inspired Chicago's boulevards and parkways.

Architecture

The destruction caused by the Great Chicago Fire led to the largest building boom in the history of the nation. In 1885, the first steel-framed high-rise building, the Home Insurance Building, rose in the city as Chicago ushered in the skyscraper era, which would then be followed by many other cities around the world. Today, Chicago's skyline is among the world's tallest and densest.

Some of the United States' tallest towers are located in Chicago; Willis Tower (formerly Sears Tower) is the second tallest building in the Western Hemisphere after One World Trade Center, and Trump International Hotel and Tower is the third tallest in the country. The Loop's historic buildings include the Chicago Board of Trade Building, the Fine Arts Building, 35 East Wacker, and the Chicago Building, 860-880 Lake Shore Drive Apartments by Mies van der Rohe. Many other architects have left their impression on the Chicago skyline such as Daniel Burnham, Louis Sullivan, Charles B. Atwood, John Root, and Helmut Jahn.

The Merchandise Mart, once first on the list of largest buildings in the world, currently listed as 44th-largest, had its own zip code until 2008, and stands near the junction of the North and South branches of the Chicago River. Presently, the four tallest buildings in the city are Willis Tower (formerly the Sears Tower, also a building with its own zip code), Trump International Hotel and Tower, the Aon Center (previously the Standard Oil Building), and the John Hancock Center. Industrial districts, such as some areas on the South Side, the areas along the Chicago Sanitary and Ship Canal, and the Northwest Indiana area are clustered.

Chicago gave its name to the Chicago School and was home to the Prairie School, two movements in architecture. Multiple kinds and scales of houses, townhouses, condominiums, and apartment buildings can be found throughout Chicago. Large swaths of the city's residential areas away from the lake are characterized by brick bungalows built from the early 20th century through the end of World War II. Chicago is also a prominent center of the Polish Cathedral style of church architecture. The Chicago suburb of Oak Park was home to famous architect Frank Lloyd Wright, who had designed The Robie House located near the University of Chicago.

A popular tourist activity is to take an architecture boat tour along the Chicago River.

Monuments and public art

Chicago is famous for its outdoor public art with donors establishing funding for such art as far back as Benjamin Ferguson's 1905 trust. A number of Chicago's public art works are by modern figurative artists. Among these are Chagall's Four Seasons; the Chicago Picasso; Miro's Chicago; Calder's Flamingo; Oldenburg's Batcolumn; Moore's Large Interior Form, 1953-54, Man Enters the Cosmos and Nuclear Energy; Dubuffet's Monument with Standing Beast, Abakanowicz's Agora; and, Anish Kapoor's Cloud Gate which has become an icon of the city. Some events which shaped the city's history have also been memorialized by art works, including the Great Northern Migration (Saar) and the centennial of statehood for Illinois. Finally, two fountains near the Loop also function as monumental works of art: Plensa's Crown Fountain as well as Burnham and Bennett's Buckingham Fountain.

More representational and portrait statuary includes a number of works by Lorado Taft (Fountain of Time, The Crusader, Eternal Silence, and the Heald Square Monument completed by Crunelle), French's Statue of the Republic, Edward Kemys's Lions, Saint-Gaudens's Abraham Lincoln: The Man (a.k.a. Standing Lincoln) and Abraham Lincoln: The Head of State (a.k.a. Seated Lincoln), Brioschi's Christopher Columbus, Meštrović's The Bowman and The Spearman, Dallin's Signal of Peace, Fairbanks's The Chicago Lincoln, Boyle's The Alarm, Polasek's memorial to Masaryk, memorials along Solidarity Promenade to Kościuszko, Havliček and Copernicus by Chodzinski, Strachovský, and Thorvaldsen, a memorial to General Logan by Saint-Gaudens, and Kearney's Moose (W-02-03). A number of statues also honor recent local heroes such as Michael Jordan (by Amrany and Rotblatt-Amrany), Stan Mikita, and Bobby Hull outside of the United Center; Harry Caray (by Amrany and Cella) outside Wrigley field, Jack Brickhouse (by McKenna) next to the WGN studios, and Irv Kupcinet at the Wabash Avenue Bridge.

There are preliminary plans to erect a 1:1‑scale replica of Wacław Szymanowski's Art Nouveau statue of Frédéric Chopin found in Warsaw's Royal Baths along Chicago's lakefront in addition to a different sculpture commemorating the artist in Chopin Park for the 200th anniversary of Frédéric Chopin's birth.

Climate

The city lies within the typical hot-summer humid continental climate (Köppen: Dfa), and experiences four distinct seasons. Summers are hot and humid, with frequent heat waves. In a normal summer, temperatures reach at least  on as many as 23 days, with lakefront locations staying cooler when winds blow off the lake. Winters are relatively cold and snowy. Blizzards do occur, such as in winter 2011. There are many sunny but cold days. January and February are the coldest months. Measurable snowfall can continue through the first or second week of April.

Spring and autumn are mild, short seasons, typically with low humidity. The city lies within USDA plant hardiness zone 6a, transitioning to 5b in the suburbs.

Midway Airport reached  one day prior and recorded a heat index of  during the 1995 heatwave. Most of the city's rainfall is brought by thunderstorms, averaging 38 a year. The region is prone to severe thunderstorms during the spring and summer which can produce large hail, damaging winds, and occasionally tornadoes. 

Like other major cities, Chicago experiences an urban heat island, making the city and its suburbs milder than surrounding rural areas, especially at night and in winter. The proximity to Lake Michigan tends to keep the Chicago lakefront somewhat cooler in summer and less brutally cold in winter than inland parts of the city and suburbs away from the lake. Northeast winds from wintertime cyclones departing south of the region sometimes bring the city lake-effect snow.

Time zone
As in the rest of the state of Illinois, Chicago forms part of the Central Time Zone. The border with the Eastern Time Zone is located a short distance to the east, used in Michigan and certain parts of Indiana.

Demographics

During its first hundred years, Chicago was one of the fastest-growing cities in the world. When founded in 1833, fewer than 200 people had settled on what was then the American frontier. By the time of its first census, seven years later, the population had reached over 4,000. In the forty years from 1850 to 1890, the city's population grew from slightly under 30,000 to over 1 million. At the end of the 19th century, Chicago was the fifth-largest city in the world, and the largest of the cities that did not exist at the dawn of the century. Within sixty years of the Great Chicago Fire of 1871, the population went from about 300,000 to over 3 million, and reached its highest ever recorded population of 3.6 million for the 1950 census.

From the last two decades of the 19th century, Chicago was the destination of waves of immigrants from Ireland, Southern, Central and Eastern Europe, including Italians, Jews, Russians, Poles, Greeks, Lithuanians, Bulgarians, Albanians, Romanians, Turkish, Croatians, Serbs, Bosnians, Montenegrins and Czechs. To these ethnic groups, the basis of the city's industrial working class, were added an additional influx of African Americans from the American South—with Chicago's black population doubling between 1910 and 1920 and doubling again between 1920 and 1930.

In the 1920s and 1930s, the great majority of African Americans moving to Chicago settled in a so‑called "Black Belt" on the city's South Side. A large number of blacks also settled on the West Side. By 1930, two-thirds of Chicago's black population lived in sections of the city which were 90% black in racial composition. Chicago's South Side emerged as United States second-largest urban black concentration, following New York's Harlem. In 1990, Chicago's South Side and the adjoining south suburbs constituted the largest black majority region in the entire United States.

Chicago's population declined in the latter half of the 20th century, from over 3.6 million in 1950 down to under 2.7 million by 2010. By the time of the official census count in 1990, it was overtaken by Los Angeles as the United States' second largest city.

The city has seen a rise in population for the 2000 census and after a decrease in 2010, it rose again for the 2020 census.

According to U.S. census estimates , Chicago's largest racial or ethnic group is non-Hispanic White at 32.8% of the population, Blacks at 30.1% and the Hispanic population at 29.0% of the population.

Chicago has the third-largest LGBT population in the United States. In 2018, the Chicago Department of Health, estimated 7.5% of the adult population, approximately 146,000 Chicagoans, were LGBTQ. In 2015, roughly 4% of the population identified as LGBT. Since the 2013 legalization of same-sex marriage in Illinois, over 10,000 same-sex couples have wed in Cook County, a majority of them in Chicago.

Chicago became a "de jure" sanctuary city in 2012 when Mayor Rahm Emanuel and the City Council passed the Welcoming City Ordinance.

According to the U.S. Census Bureau's American Community Survey data estimates for 2008–2012, the median income for a household in the city was $47,408, and the median income for a family was $54,188. Male full-time workers had a median income of $47,074 versus $42,063 for females. About 18.3% of families and 22.1% of the population lived below the poverty line. In 2018, Chicago ranked seventh globally for the highest number of ultra-high-net-worth residents with roughly 3,300 residents worth more than $30 million.

According to the 2008–2012 American Community Survey, the ancestral groups having 10,000 or more persons in Chicago were:

 Ireland (137,799)
 Poland (134,032)
 Germany (120,328)
 Italy (77,967)
 China (66,978)
 American (37,118)
 UK (36,145)
 recent African (32,727)
 India (25,000)
 Russia (19,771)
 Arab (17,598)
 European (15,753)
 Sweden (15,151)
 Japan (15,142)
 Greece (15,129)
 France (except Basque) (11,410)
 Ukraine (11,104)
 West Indian (except Hispanic groups) (10,349)

Persons identifying themselves in "Other groups" were classified at 1.72 million, and unclassified or not reported were approximately 153,000.

Religion

According to a 2014 study by the Pew Research Center, Christianity is the most prevalently practiced religion in Chicago (71%), with the city being the fourth-most religious metropolis in the United States after Dallas, Atlanta and Houston. Roman Catholicism and Protestantism are the largest branches (34% and 35% respectively), followed by Eastern Orthodoxy and Jehovah's Witnesses with 1% each. Chicago also has a sizable non-Christian population. Non-Christian groups include Irreligious (22%), Judaism (3%), Islam (2%), Buddhism (1%) and Hinduism (1%).

Chicago is the headquarters of several religious denominations, including the Evangelical Covenant Church and the Evangelical Lutheran Church in America. It is the seat of several dioceses. The Fourth Presbyterian Church is one of the largest Presbyterian congregations in the United States based on memberships. Since the 20th century Chicago has also been the headquarters of the Assyrian Church of the East. In 2014 the Catholic Church was the largest individual Christian denomination (34%), with the Roman Catholic Archdiocese of Chicago being the largest Catholic jurisdiction. Evangelical Protestantism form the largest theological Protestant branch (16%), followed by Mainline Protestants (11%), and historically Black churches (8%). Among denominational Protestant branches, Baptists formed the largest group in Chicago (10%); followed by Nondenominational (5%); Lutherans (4%); and Pentecostals (3%).

Non-Christian faiths accounted for 7% of the religious population in 2014. Judaism has at least 261,000 adherents which is 3% of the population, making it the second largest religion. A 2020 study estimated the total Jewish population of the Chicago metropolitan area, both religious and irreligious, at 319,600.

The first two Parliament of the World's Religions in 1893 and 1993 were held in Chicago. Many international religious leaders have visited Chicago, including Mother Teresa, the Dalai Lama and Pope John Paul II in 1979.

Economy

Chicago has the third-largest gross metropolitan product in the United States—about $670.5 billion according to September 2017 estimates. The city has also been rated as having the most balanced economy in the United States, due to its high level of diversification. In 2007, Chicago was named the fourth-most important business center in the world in the MasterCard Worldwide Centers of Commerce Index. Additionally, the Chicago metropolitan area recorded the greatest number of new or expanded corporate facilities in the United States for calendar year 2014. The Chicago metropolitan area has the third-largest science and engineering work force of any metropolitan area in the nation. In 2009 Chicago placed ninth on the UBS list of the world's richest cities. Chicago was the base of commercial operations for industrialists John Crerar, John Whitfield Bunn, Richard Teller Crane, Marshall Field, John Farwell, Julius Rosenwald and many other commercial visionaries who laid the foundation for Midwestern and global industry.

Chicago is a major world financial center, with the second-largest central business district in the United States. The city is the seat of the Federal Reserve Bank of Chicago, the Bank's Seventh District. The city has major financial and futures exchanges, including the Chicago Stock Exchange, the Chicago Board Options Exchange (CBOE), and the Chicago Mercantile Exchange (the "Merc"), which is owned, along with the Chicago Board of Trade (CBOT) by Chicago's CME Group. In 2017, Chicago exchanges traded 4.7 billion derivatives with a face value of over one quadrillion dollars. Chase Bank has its commercial and retail banking headquarters in Chicago's Chase Tower. Academically, Chicago has been influential through the Chicago school of economics, which fielded some 12 Nobel Prize winners.

The city and its surrounding metropolitan area contain the third-largest labor pool in the United States with about 4.63 million workers. Illinois is home to 66 Fortune 1000 companies, including those in Chicago. The city of Chicago also hosts 12 Fortune Global 500 companies and 17 Financial Times 500 companies. The city claims three Dow 30 companies: aerospace giant Boeing, which moved its headquarters from Seattle to the Chicago Loop in 2001, McDonald's and Walgreens Boots Alliance. For six consecutive years since 2013, Chicago was ranked the nation's top metropolitan area for corporate relocations. Three Fortune 500 companies left Chicago in 2022, leaving the city with 35, still second to New York City.

Manufacturing, printing, publishing, and food processing also play major roles in the city's economy. Several medical products and services companies are headquartered in the Chicago area, including Baxter International, Boeing, Abbott Laboratories, and the Healthcare division of General Electric. In addition to Boeing, which located its headquarters in Chicago in 2001, and United Airlines in 2011, GE Transportation moved its offices to the city in 2013 and GE Healthcare moved its HQ to the city in 2016, as did ThyssenKrupp North America, and agriculture giant Archer Daniels Midland. Moreover, the construction of the Illinois and Michigan Canal, which helped move goods from the Great Lakes south on the Mississippi River, and of the railroads in the 19th century made the city a major transportation center in the United States. In the 1840s, Chicago became a major grain port, and in the 1850s and 1860s Chicago's pork and beef industry expanded. As the major meat companies grew in Chicago many, such as Armour and Company, created global enterprises. Although the meatpacking industry currently plays a lesser role in the city's economy, Chicago continues to be a major transportation and distribution center. Lured by a combination of large business customers, federal research dollars, and a large hiring pool fed by the area's universities, Chicago is also the site of a growing number of web startup companies like CareerBuilder, Orbitz, Basecamp, Groupon, Feedburner, Grubhub and NowSecure.

Prominent food companies based in Chicago include the world headquarters of Conagra, Ferrara Candy Company, Kraft Heinz, McDonald's, Mondelez International, Quaker Oats, and US Foods.

Chicago has been a hub of the retail sector since its early development, with Montgomery Ward, Sears, and Marshall Field's. Today the Chicago metropolitan area is the headquarters of several retailers, including Walgreens, Sears, Ace Hardware, Claire's, ULTA Beauty and Crate & Barrel. Since the 2020 COVID-19 pandemic, four large companies left the Chicago area, Boeing left to focus on its defense contracts, Caterpillar, and Tyson Foods left to consolidate operations, and Citadel LLC cited crime-related factors. Citadel's CEO Ken Griffin, formerly the richest Illinois resident, had been engaged in a three-year feud with Illinois governor J. B. Pritzker.  In 2022, Kellogg's announced that the new spin-off of its snack business will move to the Chicago area, and Google announced a major real estate acquisition and expansion in the Loop.

Late in the 19th century, Chicago was part of the bicycle craze, with the Western Wheel Company, which introduced stamping to the production process and significantly reduced costs, while early in the 20th century, the city was part of the automobile revolution, hosting the Brass Era car builder Bugmobile, which was founded there in 1907. Chicago was also the site of the Schwinn Bicycle Company.

Chicago is a major world convention destination. The city's main convention center is McCormick Place. With its four interconnected buildings, it is the largest convention center in the nation and third-largest in the world. Chicago also ranks third in the U.S. (behind Las Vegas and Orlando) in number of conventions hosted annually.

Chicago's minimum wage for non-tipped employees is one of the highest in the nation and reached $15 in 2021.

Culture and contemporary life

The city's waterfront location and nightlife has attracted residents and tourists alike. Over a third of the city population is concentrated in the lakefront neighborhoods from Rogers Park in the north to South Shore in the south. The city has many upscale dining establishments as well as many ethnic restaurant districts. These districts include the Mexican American neighborhoods, such as Pilsen along 18th street, and La Villita along 26th Street; the Puerto Rican enclave of Paseo Boricua in the Humboldt Park neighborhood; Greektown, along South Halsted Street, immediately west of downtown; Little Italy, along Taylor Street; Chinatown in Armour Square; Polish Patches in West Town; Little Seoul in Albany Park around Lawrence Avenue; Little Vietnam near Broadway in Uptown; and the Desi area, along Devon Avenue in West Ridge.

Downtown is the center of Chicago's financial, cultural, governmental and commercial institutions and the site of Grant Park and many of the city's skyscrapers. Many of the city's financial institutions, such as the CBOT and the Federal Reserve Bank of Chicago, are located within a section of downtown called "The Loop", which is an eight-block by five-block area of city streets that is encircled by elevated rail tracks. The term "The Loop" is largely used by locals to refer to the entire downtown area as well. The central area includes the Near North Side, the Near South Side, and the Near West Side, as well as the Loop. These areas contribute famous skyscrapers, abundant restaurants, shopping, museums, a stadium for the Chicago Bears, convention facilities, parkland, and beaches.

Lincoln Park contains the Lincoln Park Zoo and the Lincoln Park Conservatory. The River North Gallery District features the nation's largest concentration of contemporary art galleries outside of New York City.

Lakeview is home to Boystown, the city's large LGBT nightlife and culture center. The Chicago Pride Parade, held the last Sunday in June, is one of the world's largest with over a million people in attendance.
North Halsted Street is the main thoroughfare of Boystown.

The South Side neighborhood of Hyde Park is the home of former US President Barack Obama. It also contains the University of Chicago, ranked one of the world's top ten universities, and the Museum of Science and Industry. Two of the city's largest parks are also located on this side of the city: Jackson Park, bordering the waterfront, hosted the World's Columbian Exposition in 1893, and is the site of the aforementioned museum; and slightly west sits Washington Park. The two parks themselves are connected by a wide strip of parkland called the Midway Plaisance, running adjacent to the University of Chicago. The South Side hosts one of the city's largest parades, the annual African American Bud Billiken Parade and Picnic, which travels through Bronzeville to Washington Park. Ford Motor Company has an automobile assembly plant on the South Side in Hegewisch, and most of the facilities of the Port of Chicago are also on the South Side.

The West Side holds the Garfield Park Conservatory, one of the largest collections of tropical plants in any U.S. city. Prominent Latino cultural attractions found here include Humboldt Park's Institute of Puerto Rican Arts and Culture and the annual Puerto Rican People's Parade, as well as the National Museum of Mexican Art and St. Adalbert's Church in Pilsen. The Near West Side holds the University of Illinois at Chicago and was once home to Oprah Winfrey's Harpo Studios, the site of which has been rebuilt as the global headquarters of McDonald's.

The city's distinctive accent, made famous by its use in classic films like The Blues Brothers and television programs like the Saturday Night Live skit "Bill Swerski's Superfans", is an advanced form of Inland Northern American English. This dialect can also be found in other cities bordering the Great Lakes such as Cleveland, Milwaukee, Detroit, and Rochester, New York, and most prominently features a rearrangement of certain vowel sounds, such as the short 'a' sound as in "cat", which can sound more like "kyet" to outsiders. The accent remains well associated with the city.

Entertainment and the arts 

Renowned Chicago theater companies include the Goodman Theatre in the Loop; the Steppenwolf Theatre Company and Victory Gardens Theater in Lincoln Park; and the Chicago Shakespeare Theater at Navy Pier. Broadway In Chicago offers Broadway-style entertainment at five theaters: the Nederlander Theatre, CIBC Theatre, Cadillac Palace Theatre, Auditorium Building of Roosevelt University, and Broadway Playhouse at Water Tower Place. Polish language productions for Chicago's large Polish speaking population can be seen at the historic Gateway Theatre in Jefferson Park. Since 1968, the Joseph Jefferson Awards are given annually to acknowledge excellence in theater in the Chicago area. Chicago's theater community spawned modern improvisational theater, and includes the prominent groups The Second City and I.O. (formerly ImprovOlympic).

The Chicago Symphony Orchestra (CSO) performs at Symphony Center, and is recognized as one of the best orchestras in the world. Also performing regularly at Symphony Center is the Chicago Sinfonietta, a more diverse and multicultural counterpart to the CSO. In the summer, many outdoor concerts are given in Grant Park and Millennium Park. The Civic Opera House is home to the Lyric Opera of Chicago. The Lithuanian Opera Company of Chicago was founded by Lithuanian Chicagoans in 1956, and presents operas in Lithuanian.

The Joffrey Ballet and Chicago Festival Ballet perform in various venues, including the Harris Theater in Millennium Park. Chicago has several other contemporary and jazz dance troupes, such as the Hubbard Street Dance Chicago and Chicago Dance Crash.

Other live-music genre which are part of the city's cultural heritage include Chicago blues, Chicago soul, jazz, and gospel. The city is the birthplace of house music (a popular form of electronic dance music) and industrial music, and is the site of an influential hip hop scene. In the 1980s and 90s, the city was the global center for house and industrial music, two forms of music created in Chicago, as well as being popular for alternative rock, punk, and new wave. The city has been a center for rave culture, since the 1980s. A flourishing independent rock music culture brought forth Chicago indie. Annual festivals feature various acts, such as Lollapalooza and the Pitchfork Music Festival. Lollapalooza originated in Chicago in 1991 and at first travelled to many cities, but as of 2005 its home has been Chicago. A 2007 report on the Chicago music industry by the University of Chicago Cultural Policy Center ranked Chicago third among metropolitan U.S. areas in "size of music industry" and fourth among all U.S. cities in "number of concerts and performances".

Chicago has a distinctive fine art tradition. For much of the twentieth century, it nurtured a strong style of figurative surrealism, as in the works of Ivan Albright and Ed Paschke. In 1968 and 1969, members of the Chicago Imagists, such as Roger Brown, Leon Golub, Robert Lostutter, Jim Nutt, and Barbara Rossi produced bizarre representational paintings. Henry Darger is one of the most celebrated figures of outsider art.

Chicago contains a number of large, outdoor works by well-known artists. These include the Chicago Picasso, We Will by Richard Hunt, Miró's Chicago, Flamingo and Flying Dragon by Alexander Calder, Agora by Magdalena Abakanowicz, Monument with Standing Beast by Jean Dubuffet, Batcolumn by Claes Oldenburg, Cloud Gate by Anish Kapoor, Crown Fountain by Jaume Plensa, and the Four Seasons mosaic by Marc Chagall.

Chicago also hosts a nationally televised Thanksgiving parade that occurs annually. The Chicago Thanksgiving Parade is broadcast live nationally on WGN-TV and WGN America, featuring a variety of diverse acts from the community, marching bands from across the country, and is the only parade in the city to feature inflatable balloons every year.

Tourism

, Chicago attracted 50.17 million domestic leisure travelers, 11.09 million domestic business travelers and 1.308 million overseas visitors. These visitors contributed more than  billion to Chicago's economy. Upscale shopping along the Magnificent Mile and State Street, thousands of restaurants, as well as Chicago's eminent architecture, continue to draw tourists. The city is the United States' third-largest convention destination. A 2017 study by Walk Score ranked Chicago the sixth-most walkable of fifty largest cities in the United States. Most conventions are held at McCormick Place, just south of Soldier Field. The historic Chicago Cultural Center (1897), originally serving as the Chicago Public Library, now houses the city's Visitor Information Center, galleries and exhibit halls. The ceiling of its Preston Bradley Hall includes a  Tiffany glass dome. Grant Park holds Millennium Park, Buckingham Fountain (1927), and the Art Institute of Chicago. The park also hosts the annual Taste of Chicago festival. In Millennium Park, the reflective Cloud Gate public sculpture by artist Anish Kapoor is the centerpiece of the AT&T Plaza in Millennium Park. Also, an outdoor restaurant transforms into an ice rink in the winter season. Two tall glass sculptures make up the Crown Fountain. The fountain's two towers display visual effects from LED images of Chicagoans' faces, along with water spouting from their lips. Frank Gehry's detailed, stainless steel band shell, the Jay Pritzker Pavilion, hosts the classical Grant Park Music Festival concert series. Behind the pavilion's stage is the Harris Theater for Music and Dance, an indoor venue for mid-sized performing arts companies, including the Chicago Opera Theater and Music of the Baroque.

In the summer of 2016, Navy Pier constructed a DW60 Ferris wheel. Dutch Wheels, a world renowned company that manufactures ferris wheels, was selected to design the new wheel. It features 42 navy blue gondolas that can hold up to eight adults and two children. It also has entertainment systems inside the gondolas as well as a climate controlled environment. The new DW60 is the first in the United States and is the sixth tallest in the U.S. Chicago was the first city in the world to ever erect a ferris wheel.

On June 4, 1998, the city officially opened the Museum Campus, a  lakefront park, surrounding three of the city's main museums, each of which is of national importance: the Adler Planetarium & Astronomy Museum, the Field Museum of Natural History, and the Shedd Aquarium. The Museum Campus joins the southern section of Grant Park, which includes the renowned Art Institute of Chicago. Buckingham Fountain anchors the downtown park along the lakefront. The University of Chicago Oriental Institute has an extensive collection of ancient Egyptian and Near Eastern archaeological artifacts. Other museums and galleries in Chicago include the Chicago History Museum, the Driehaus Museum, the DuSable Museum of African American History, the Museum of Contemporary Art, the Peggy Notebaert Nature Museum, the Polish Museum of America, the Museum of Broadcast Communications, the Pritzker Military Library, the Chicago Architecture Foundation, and the Museum of Science and Industry.

With an estimated completion date of 2020, the Barack Obama Presidential Center will be housed at the University of Chicago in Hyde Park and include both the Obama presidential library and offices of the Obama Foundation.

The Willis Tower (formerly named Sears Tower) is a popular destination for tourists. The Willis Tower has an observation deck open to tourists year round with high up views overlooking Chicago and Lake Michigan. The observation deck includes an enclosed glass balcony that extends  out on the side of the building. Tourists are able to look straight down.

In 2013, Chicago was chosen as one of the "Top Ten Cities in the United States" to visit for its restaurants, skyscrapers, museums, and waterfront, by the readers of Condé Nast Traveler, and in 2020 for the fourth year in a row, Chicago was named the top U.S. city tourism destination.

Cuisine

 
Chicago lays claim to a large number of regional specialties that reflect the city's ethnic and working-class roots. Included among these are its nationally renowned deep-dish pizza; this style is said to have originated at Pizzeria Uno. The Chicago-style thin crust is also popular in the city. Certain Chicago pizza favorites include Lou Malnati's and Giordano's.

The Chicago-style hot dog, typically an all-beef hot dog, is loaded with an array of toppings that often includes pickle relish, yellow mustard, pickled sport peppers, tomato wedges, dill pickle spear and topped off with celery salt on a poppy seed bun. Enthusiasts of the Chicago-style hot dog frown upon the use of ketchup as a garnish, but may prefer to add giardiniera.

A distinctly Chicago sandwich, the Italian beef sandwich is thinly sliced beef simmered in au jus and served on an Italian roll with sweet peppers or spicy giardiniera. A popular modification is the Combo—an Italian beef sandwich with the addition of an Italian sausage. The Maxwell Street Polish is a grilled or deep-fried kielbasa—on a hot dog roll, topped with grilled onions, yellow mustard, and hot sport peppers.

Chicken Vesuvio is roasted bone-in chicken cooked in oil and garlic next to garlicky oven-roasted potato wedges and a sprinkling of green peas. The Puerto Rican-influenced jibarito is a sandwich made with flattened, fried green plantains instead of bread. The mother-in-law is a tamale topped with chili and served on a hot dog bun. The tradition of serving the Greek dish saganaki while aflame has its origins in Chicago's Greek community. The appetizer, which consists of a square of fried cheese, is doused with Metaxa and flambéed table-side. Annual festivals feature various Chicago signature dishes, such as Taste of Chicago and the Chicago Food Truck Festival.

One of the world's most decorated restaurants and a recipient of three Michelin stars, Alinea is located in Chicago. Well-known chefs who have had restaurants in Chicago include: Charlie Trotter, Rick Tramonto, Grant Achatz, and Rick Bayless. In 2003, Robb Report named Chicago the country's "most exceptional dining destination".

Literature

Chicago literature finds its roots in the city's tradition of lucid, direct journalism, lending to a strong tradition of social realism. In the Encyclopedia of Chicago, Northwestern University Professor Bill Savage describes Chicago fiction as prose which tries to "capture the essence of the city, its spaces and its people". The challenge for early writers was that Chicago was a frontier outpost that transformed into a global metropolis in the span of two generations. Narrative fiction of that time, much of it in the style of "high-flown romance" and "genteel realism", needed a new approach to describe the urban social, political, and economic conditions of Chicago. Nonetheless, Chicagoans worked hard to create a literary tradition that would stand the test of time, and create a "city of feeling" out of concrete, steel, vast lake, and open prairie. Much notable Chicago fiction focuses on the city itself, with social criticism keeping exultation in check.

At least three short periods in the history of Chicago have had a lasting influence on American literature. These include from the time of the Great Chicago Fire to about 1900, what became known as the Chicago Literary Renaissance in the 1910s and early 1920s, and the period of the Great Depression through the 1940s.

What would become the influential Poetry magazine was founded in 1912 by Harriet Monroe, who was working as an art critic for the Chicago Tribune. The magazine discovered such poets as Gwendolyn Brooks, James Merrill, and John Ashbery. T. S. Eliot's first professionally published poem, "The Love Song of J. Alfred Prufrock", was first published by Poetry. Contributors have included Ezra Pound, William Butler Yeats, William Carlos Williams, Langston Hughes, and Carl Sandburg, among others. The magazine was instrumental in launching the Imagist and Objectivist poetic movements. From the 1950s through 1970s, American poetry continued to evolve in Chicago. In the 1980s, a modern form of poetry performance began in Chicago, the poetry slam.

Sports

Sporting News named Chicago the "Best Sports City" in the United States in 1993, 2006, and 2010. Along with Boston, Chicago is the only city to continuously host major professional sports since 1871, having only taken 1872 and 1873 off due to the Great Chicago Fire. Additionally, Chicago is one of the eight cities in the United States to have won championships in the four major professional leagues and, along with Los Angeles, New York, Philadelphia and Washington, is one of five cities to have won soccer championships as well. All of its major franchises have won championships within recent years – the Bears (1985), the Bulls (1991, 1992, 1993, 1996, 1997, and 1998), the White Sox (2005), the Cubs (2016), the Blackhawks (2010, 2013, 2015), and the Fire (1998). Chicago has the third most franchises in the four major North American sports leagues with five, behind the New York and Los Angeles Metropolitan Areas, and have six top-level professional sports clubs when including Chicago Fire FC of Major League Soccer (MLS).

The city has two Major League Baseball (MLB) teams: the Chicago Cubs of the National League play in Wrigley Field on the North Side; and the Chicago White Sox of the American League play in Guaranteed Rate Field on the South Side. Chicago is the only city that has had more than one MLB franchise every year since the AL began in 1901 (New York hosted only one between 1958 and early 1962). The two teams have faced each other in a World Series only once: in 1906, when the White Sox, known as the "Hitless Wonders," defeated the Cubs, 4–2.

The Cubs are the oldest Major League Baseball team to have never changed their city; they have played in Chicago since 1871, and continuously so since 1874 due to the Great Chicago Fire. They have played more games and have more wins than any other team in Major League baseball since 1876. They have won three World Series titles, including the 2016 World Series, but had the dubious honor of having the two longest droughts in American professional sports: They had not won their sport's title since 1908, and had not participated in a World Series since 1945, both records, until they beat the Cleveland Indians in the 2016 World Series.

The White Sox have played on the South Side continuously since 1901, with all three of their home fields throughout the years being within blocks of one another. They have won three World Series titles (1906, 1917, 2005) and six American League pennants, including the first in 1901. The Sox are fifth in the American League in all-time wins, and sixth in pennants.

The Chicago Bears, one of the last two remaining charter members of the National Football League (NFL), have won nine NFL Championships, including the 1985 Super Bowl XX. The other remaining charter franchise, the Chicago Cardinals, also started out in the city, but is now known as the Arizona Cardinals. The Bears have won more games in the history of the NFL than any other team, and only the Green Bay Packers, their longtime rivals, have won more championships. The Bears play their home games at Soldier Field. Soldier Field re-opened in 2003 after an extensive renovation.

The Chicago Bulls of the National Basketball Association (NBA) is one of the most recognized basketball teams in the world. During the 1990s, with Michael Jordan leading them, the Bulls won six NBA championships in eight seasons. They also boast the youngest player to win the NBA Most Valuable Player Award, Derrick Rose, who won it for the 2010–11 season.

The Chicago Blackhawks of the National Hockey League (NHL) began play in 1926, and are one of the "Original Six" teams of the NHL. The Blackhawks have won six Stanley Cups, including in 2010, 2013, and 2015. Both the Bulls and the Blackhawks play at the United Center.

Chicago Fire FC is a member of Major League Soccer (MLS) and plays at Soldier Field. After playing its first eight seasons at Soldier Field, the team moved to suburban Bridgeview to play at SeatGeek Stadium. In 2019, the team announced a move back to Soldier Field. The Fire have won one league title and four U.S. Open Cups, since their founding in 1997. In 1994, the United States hosted a successful FIFA World Cup with games played at Soldier Field.

The Chicago Sky is a professional basketball team playing in the Women's National Basketball Association (WNBA). They play home games at the Wintrust Arena. The team was founded before the 2006 WNBA season began.

The Chicago Marathon has been held each year since 1977 except for 1987, when a half marathon was run in its place. The Chicago Marathon is one of six World Marathon Majors.

Five area colleges play in Division I conferences: two from major conferences—the DePaul Blue Demons (Big East Conference) and the Northwestern Wildcats (Big Ten Conference)—and three from other D1 conferences—the Chicago State Cougars (Western Athletic Conference); the Loyola Ramblers (Missouri Valley Conference); and the UIC Flames (Horizon League).

Chicago has also entered into esports with the creation of the Chicago Huntsmen, a professional Call of Duty team that participates within the CDL. At the Call of Duty League's Launch Week games in Minneapolis, Minnesota, the Chicago Huntsmen went on to beat both the Dallas Empire and Optic Gaming Los Angeles.

Parks and greenspace

When Chicago was incorporated in 1837, it chose the motto Urbs in Horto, a Latin phrase which means "City in a Garden". There are 31 sand beaches, a plethora of museums, two world-class conservatories, and 50 nature areas.

There is a historic boulevard system, a network of wide, tree-lined boulevards which connect a number of Chicago parks. The boulevards and the parks were authorized by the Illinois legislature in 1869. A number of Chicago neighborhoods emerged along these roadways in the 19th century. The building of the boulevard system continued intermittently until 1942. It includes nineteen boulevards, eight parks, and six squares, along twenty-six miles of interconnected streets. The Chicago Park Boulevard System Historic District was listed on the National Register of Historic Places in 2018.

With berths for more than 6,000 boats, the Chicago Park District operates the nation's largest municipal harbor system. In addition to ongoing beautification and renewal projects for the existing parks, a number of new parks have been added in recent years, such as the Ping Tom Memorial Park in Chinatown, DuSable Park on the Near North Side, and most notably, Millennium Park, which is in the northwestern corner of one of Chicago's oldest parks, Grant Park in the Chicago Loop.

The wealth of greenspace afforded by Chicago's parks is further augmented by the Cook County Forest Preserves, a network of open spaces containing forest, prairie, wetland, streams, and lakes that are set aside as natural areas which lie along the city's outskirts, including both the Chicago Botanic Garden in Glencoe and the Brookfield Zoo in Brookfield. The park is listed on the National Register of Historic Places listings in South Side Chicago.

Law and government

Government

The government of the City of Chicago is divided into executive and legislative branches. The mayor of Chicago is the chief executive, elected by general election for a term of four years, with no term limits. The current mayor is Lori Lightfoot. The mayor appoints commissioners and other officials who oversee the various departments. As well as the mayor, Chicago's clerk and treasurer are also elected citywide. The City Council is the legislative branch and is made up of 50 aldermen, one elected from each ward in the city. The council takes official action through the passage of ordinances and resolutions and approves the city budget.

The Chicago Police Department provides law enforcement and the Chicago Fire Department provides fire suppression and emergency medical services for the city and its residents. Civil and criminal law cases are heard in the Cook County Circuit Court of the State of Illinois court system, or in the Northern District of Illinois, in the federal system. In the state court, the public prosecutor is the Illinois state's attorney; in the Federal court it is the United States attorney.

Politics

During much of the last half of the 19th century, Chicago's politics were dominated by a growing Democratic Party organization. During the 1880s and 1890s, Chicago had a powerful radical tradition with large and highly organized socialist, anarchist and labor organizations. For much of the 20th century, Chicago has been among the largest and most reliable Democratic strongholds in the United States; with Chicago's Democratic vote the state of Illinois has been "solid blue" in presidential elections since 1992. Even before then, it was not unheard of for Republican presidential candidates to win handily in downstate Illinois, only to lose statewide due to large Democratic margins in Chicago. The citizens of Chicago have not elected a Republican mayor since 1927, when William Thompson was voted into office. The strength of the party in the city is partly a consequence of Illinois state politics, where the Republicans have come to represent rural and farm concerns while the Democrats support urban issues such as Chicago's public school funding.

Chicago contains less than 25% of the state's population, but it is split between eight of Illinois' 19 districts in the United States House of Representatives. All eight of the city's representatives are Democrats; only two Republicans have represented a significant portion of the city since 1973, for one term each: Robert P. Hanrahan from 1973 to 1975, and Michael Patrick Flanagan from 1995 to 1997.

Machine politics persisted in Chicago after the decline of similar machines in other large U.S. cities. During much of that time, the city administration found opposition mainly from a liberal "independent" faction of the Democratic Party. The independents finally gained control of city government in 1983 with the election of Harold Washington (in office 1983–1987). From 1989 until May 16, 2011, Chicago was under the leadership of its longest-serving mayor, Richard M. Daley, the son of Richard J. Daley. Because of the dominance of the Democratic Party in Chicago, the Democratic primary vote held in the spring is generally more significant than the general elections in November for U.S. House and Illinois State seats. The aldermanic, mayoral, and other city offices are filled through nonpartisan elections with runoffs as needed.

The city is home of former United States President Barack Obama and First Lady Michelle Obama; Barack Obama was formerly a state legislator representing Chicago and later a US senator. The Obamas' residence is located near the University of Chicago in Kenwood on the city's south side.

Crime

Chicago's crime rate in 2020 was 3,926 per 100,000 people. Chicago had a murder rate of 18.5 per 100,000 residents in 2012, ranking 16th among US cities with 100,000 people or more. This was higher than in New York City and Los Angeles, the two largest cities in the United States, which have lower murder rates and lower total homicides. However, it was less than in many smaller American cities, including New Orleans, Newark, and Detroit, although the latter has fallen substantially in recent years. The 2015 year-end crime statistics showed there were 468 murders in Chicago in 2015 compared with 416 the year before, a 12.5% increase, as well as 2,900 shootings—13% more than the year prior, and up 29% since 2013. Chicago had more homicides than any other city in 2015 in total but not on per capita basis, according to the Chicago Tribune. In its annual crime statistics for 2016, the Chicago Police Department reported that the city experienced a dramatic rise in gun violence, with 4,331 shooting victims. The department also reported 762 murders in Chicago for the year 2016, a total that marked a 62.79% increase in homicides from 2015. In June 2017, the Chicago Police Department and the Federal ATF announced a new task force, similar to past task forces, to address the flow of illegal guns and repeat offenses with guns.

According to reports in 2013, "most of Chicago's violent crime comes from gangs trying to maintain control of drug-selling territories", and is specifically related to the activities of the Sinaloa Cartel, which is active in several American cities. By 2006, the cartel sought to control most illicit drug sales. Violent crime rates vary significantly by area of the city, with more economically developed areas having low rates, but other sections have much higher rates of crime. In 2013, the violent crime rate was 910 per 100,000 people; the murder rate was 10.4 – while high crime districts saw 38.9, low crime districts saw 2.5 murders per 100,000.

The number of murders in Chicago peaked at 970 in 1974, when the city's population was over 3 million people (a murder rate of about 29 per 100,000), and it reached 943 murders in 1992, (a murder rate of 34 per 100,000). However, Chicago, like other major U.S. cities, experienced a significant reduction in violent crime rates through the 1990s, falling to 448 homicides in 2004, its lowest total since 1965 and only 15.65 murders per 100,000. Chicago's homicide tally remained low during 2005 (449), 2006 (452), and 2007 (435) but rose to 510 in 2008, breaking 500 for the first time since 2003. In 2009, the murder count fell to 458 (10% down). and in 2010 Chicago's murder rate fell to 435 (16.14 per 100,000), a 5% decrease from 2009 and lowest levels since 1965. In 2011, Chicago's murders fell another 1.2% to 431 (a rate of 15.94 per 100,000). but shot up to 506 in 2012.

In 2012, Chicago ranked 21st in the United States in numbers of homicides per person, and in the first half of 2013 there was a significant drop per-person, in all categories of violent crime, including homicide (down 26%). Chicago ended 2013 with 415 murders, the lowest number of murders since 1965, and overall crime rates dropped by 16 percent. In 2013, the city's murder rate was only slightly higher than the national average as a whole. According to the FBI, St. Louis, New Orleans, Detroit, and Baltimore had the highest murder rate along with several other cities. Jens Ludwig, director of the University of Chicago Crime Lab, estimated that shootings cost the city of Chicago $2.5 billion in 2012.

Chicago began experiencing a massive surge in carjackings after 2019, and at least 1,415 such crimes took place in the city in 2020. According to the Chicago Police Department, carjackers are using face masks that are widely worn due to the ongoing COVID-19 pandemic to effectively blend in with the public and conceal their identity. On January 27, 2021, Mayor Lightfoot described the worsening wave of carjackings as being 'top of mind,' and added 40 police officers to the CPD carjacking unit.

Employee pensions 
In September 2016, an Illinois state appellate court found that cities do not have an obligation under the Illinois Constitution to pay certain benefits if those benefits had included an expiration date under whichever negotiated agreement they were covered. The Illinois Constitution prohibits governments from doing anything that could cause retirement benefits for government workers to be "diminished or impaired." In this particular case, the fact that the workers' agreements had expiration dates let the city of Chicago set an expiration date of 2013 for contribution to health benefits for workers who retired after 1989.

Education

Schools and libraries
Chicago Public Schools (CPS) is the governing body of the school district that contains over 600 public elementary and high schools citywide, including several selective-admission magnet schools. There are eleven selective enrollment high schools in the Chicago Public Schools, designed to meet the needs of Chicago's most academically advanced students. These schools offer a rigorous curriculum with mainly honors and Advanced Placement (AP) courses. Walter Payton College Prep High School is ranked number one in the city of Chicago and the state of Illinois. Northside College Preparatory High School is ranked second, Jones College Prep is third, and the oldest magnet school in the city, Whitney M. Young Magnet High School, which was opened in 1975, is ranked fourth. The magnet school with the largest enrollment is Lane Technical College Prep High School. Lane is one of the oldest schools in Chicago and in 2012 was designated a National Blue Ribbon School by the U.S. Department of Education.

Chicago high school rankings are determined by the average test scores on state achievement tests. The district, with an enrollment exceeding 400,545 students (2013–2014 20th Day Enrollment), is the third-largest in the U.S. On September 10, 2012, teachers for the Chicago Teachers Union went on strike for the first time since 1987 over pay, resources and other issues. According to data compiled in 2014, Chicago's "choice system", where students who test or apply and may attend one of a number of public high schools (there are about 130), sorts students of different achievement levels into different schools (high performing, middle performing, and low performing schools).

Chicago has a network of Lutheran schools, and several private schools are run by other denominations and faiths, such as the Ida Crown Jewish Academy in West Ridge. Several private schools are completely secular, such as the Latin School of Chicago in the Near North Side neighborhood, the University of Chicago Laboratory Schools in Hyde Park, the British School of Chicago and the Francis W. Parker School in Lincoln Park, the Lycée Français de Chicago in Uptown, the Feltre School in River North and the Morgan Park Academy. There are also the private Chicago Academy for the Arts, a high school focused on six different categories of the arts and the public Chicago High School for the Arts, a high school focused on five categories (visual arts, theatre, musical theatre, dance, and music) of the arts.

The Roman Catholic Archdiocese of Chicago operates Catholic schools, that include Jesuit preparatory schools and others including St. Rita of Cascia High School, De La Salle Institute, Josephinum Academy, DePaul College Prep, Cristo Rey Jesuit High School, Brother Rice High School, St. Ignatius College Preparatory School, Mount Carmel High School, Queen of Peace High School, Mother McAuley Liberal Arts High School, Marist High School, St. Patrick High School and Resurrection High School.

The Chicago Public Library system operates 3 regional libraries and 77 neighbourhood branches, including the central library.

Colleges and universities

Since the 1850s, Chicago has been a world center of higher education and research with several universities. These institutions consistently rank among the top "National Universities" in the United States, as determined by U.S. News & World Report. Highly regarded universities in Chicago and the surrounding area are: the University of Chicago; Northwestern University; Illinois Institute of Technology; Loyola University Chicago; DePaul University; Columbia College Chicago and University of Illinois at Chicago. Other notable schools include: Chicago State University; the School of the Art Institute of Chicago; East–West University; National Louis University; North Park University; Northeastern Illinois University; Robert Morris University Illinois; Roosevelt University; Saint Xavier University; Rush University; and Shimer College.

William Rainey Harper, the first president of the University of Chicago, was instrumental in the creation of the junior college concept, establishing nearby Joliet Junior College as the first in the nation in 1901. His legacy continues with the multiple community colleges in the Chicago proper, including the seven City Colleges of Chicago: Richard J. Daley College, Kennedy–King College, Malcolm X College, Olive–Harvey College, Truman College, Harold Washington College and Wilbur Wright College, in addition to the privately held MacCormac College.

Chicago also has a high concentration of post-baccalaureate institutions, graduate schools, seminaries, and theological schools, such as the Adler School of Professional Psychology, The Chicago School of Professional Psychology, the Erikson Institute, The Institute for Clinical Social Work, the Lutheran School of Theology at Chicago, the Catholic Theological Union, the Moody Bible Institute, the John Marshall Law School and the University of Chicago Divinity School.

Media

Television
The Chicago metropolitan area is the third-largest media market in North America, after New York City and Los Angeles and a major media hub. Each of the big four U.S. television networks, CBS, ABC, NBC and Fox, directly owns and operates a high-definition television station in Chicago (WBBM 2, WLS 7, WMAQ 5 and WFLD 32, respectively). Former CW affiliate WGN-TV 9, which was owned from its inception by Tribune Broadcasting (now owned by the Nexstar Media Group since 2019), is carried with some programming differences, as "WGN America" on cable and satellite TV nationwide and in parts of the Caribbean. WGN America eventually became NewsNation in 2021.

Chicago has also been the home of several prominent talk shows, including The Oprah Winfrey Show, Steve Harvey Show, The Rosie Show, The Jerry Springer Show, The Phil Donahue Show, The Jenny Jones Show, and more. The city also has one PBS member station (its second: WYCC 20, removed its affiliation with PBS in 2017): WTTW 11, producer of shows such as Sneak Previews, The Frugal Gourmet, Lamb Chop's Play-Along and The McLaughlin Group.

, Windy City Live is Chicago's only daytime talk show, which is hosted by Val Warner and Ryan Chiaverini at ABC7 Studios with a live weekday audience. Since 1999, Judge Mathis also films his syndicated arbitration-based reality court show at the NBC Tower. Beginning in January 2019, Newsy began producing 12 of its 14 hours of live news programming per day from its new facility in Chicago.

Newspapers
Two major daily newspapers are published in Chicago: the Chicago Tribune and the Chicago Sun-Times, with the Tribune having the larger circulation. There are also several regional and special-interest newspapers and magazines, such as Chicago, the Dziennik Związkowy (Polish Daily News), Draugas (the Lithuanian daily newspaper), the Chicago Reader, the SouthtownStar, the Chicago Defender, the Daily Herald, Newcity, StreetWise and the Windy City Times. The entertainment and cultural magazine Time Out Chicago and GRAB magazine are also published in the city, as well as local music magazine Chicago Innerview. In addition, Chicago is the home of satirical national news outlet, The Onion, as well as its sister pop-culture publication, The A.V. Club.

Movies and filming
Since the 1980s, many motion pictures have been filmed or set in the city such as The Untouchables, The Blues Brothers, The Matrix, Brewster's Millions, Ferris Bueller's Day Off, Sixteen Candles, Home Alone, The Fugitive, I, Robot, Mean Girls, Wanted, Batman Begins, The Dark Knight, Dhoom 3, Transformers: Dark of the Moon, Transformers: Age of Extinction, Transformers: The Last Knight, Divergent, Man of Steel, Batman v Superman: Dawn of Justice, Sinister 2, Suicide Squad, Justice League, Rampage and The Batman. In The Dark Knight Trilogy and the DC Extended Universe, Chicago was used as the inspiration and filming site for Gotham City and Metropolis respectively.

Chicago has also been the setting of a number of television shows, including the situation comedies Perfect Strangers and its spinoff Family Matters, Married... with Children, Punky Brewster, Kenan & Kel, Still Standing, The League, The Bob Newhart Show, and Shake It Up. The city served as the venue for the medical dramas ER and Chicago Hope, as well as the fantasy drama series Early Edition and the 2005–2009 drama Prison Break. Discovery Channel films two shows in Chicago: Cook County Jail and the Chicago version of Cash Cab. Other notable shows include CBS's The Good Wife and Mike and Molly.

Chicago is currently the setting for Showtime's Shameless, and NBC's Chicago Fire, Chicago P.D. and Chicago Med. All three Chicago franchise shows are filmed locally throughout Chicago and maintain strong national viewership averaging 7 million viewers per show.

Radio

Chicago has five 50,000 watt AM radio stations: the CBS Radio-owned WBBM and WSCR; the Tribune Broadcasting-owned WGN; the Cumulus Media-owned WLS; and the ESPN Radio-owned WMVP. Chicago is also home to a number of national radio shows, including Beyond the Beltway with Bruce DuMont on Sunday evenings.

Chicago Public Radio produces nationally aired programs such as PRI's This American Life and NPR's Wait Wait...Don't Tell Me!.

Music 
In 2005, indie rock artist Sufjan Stevens created a concept album about Illinois titled Illinois; many of its songs were about Chicago and its history.

Industrial genre 
The city was particularly important for the development of the harsh and electronic based music genre known as industrial. Many themes are transgressive and derived from the works of authors such as William S. Burroughs. While the genre was pioneered by Throbbing Gristle in the late 70s, the genre was largely started in the United Kingdom, with the Chicago-based record label Wax Trax! later establishing itself as America's home for the genre. The label first found success with Ministry, with the release of the cold life single, which entered the US Dance charts in 1982. The record label later signed many prominent industrial acts, with the most notable being: My Life with the Thrill Kill Kult, KMFDM, Front Line Assembly and Front 242. Richard Giraldi of the Chicago Sun-Times remarked on the significance of the label and wrote, "As important as Chess Records was to blues and soul music, Chicago's Wax Trax imprint was just as significant to the punk rock, new wave and industrial genres."

Video games
Chicago is also featured in a few video games, including Watch Dogs and Midtown Madness, a real-life, car-driving simulation game. Chicago is home to NetherRealm Studios, the developers of the Mortal Kombat series.

Infrastructure

Transportation

Chicago is a major transportation hub in the United States. It is an important component in global distribution, as it is the third-largest inter-modal port in the world after Hong Kong and Singapore.

The city of Chicago has a higher than average percentage of households without a car. In 2015, 26.5 percent of Chicago households were without a car, and increased slightly to 27.5 percent in 2016. The national average was 8.7 percent in 2016. Chicago averaged 1.12 cars per household in 2016, compared to a national average of 1.8.

Expressways

Seven mainline and four auxiliary interstate highways (55, 57, 65 (only in Indiana), 80 (also in Indiana), 88, 90 (also in Indiana), 94 (also in Indiana), 190, 290, 294, and 355) run through Chicago and its suburbs. Segments that link to the city center are named after influential politicians, with three of them named after former U.S. Presidents (Eisenhower, Kennedy, and Reagan) and one named after two-time Democratic candidate Adlai Stevenson.

The Kennedy and Dan Ryan Expressways are the busiest state maintained routes in the entire state of Illinois.

Transit systems

The Regional Transportation Authority (RTA) coordinates the operation of the three service boards: CTA, Metra, and Pace.
 The Chicago Transit Authority (CTA) handles public transportation in the City of Chicago and a few adjacent suburbs outside of the Chicago city limits. The CTA operates an extensive network of buses and a rapid transit elevated and subway system known as the Chicago "L" or just "L" (short for "elevated"), with lines designated by colors. These rapid transit lines also serve both Midway and O'Hare Airports. The CTA's rail lines consist of the Red, Blue, Green, Orange, Brown, Purple, Pink, and Yellow lines. Both the Red and Blue lines offer 24‑hour service which makes Chicago one of a handful of cities around the world (and one of two in the United States, the other being New York City) to offer rail service 24 hours a day, every day of the year, within the city's limits.
 Metra, the nation's second-most used passenger regional rail network, operates an 11-line commuter rail service in Chicago and throughout the Chicago suburbs. The Metra Electric Line shares its trackage with Northern Indiana Commuter Transportation District's South Shore Line, which provides commuter service between South Bend and Chicago.
 Pace provides bus and paratransit service in over 200 surrounding suburbs with some extensions into the city as well. A 2005 study found that one quarter of commuters used public transit.

Greyhound Lines provides inter-city bus service to and from the city, and Chicago is also the hub for the Midwest network of Megabus (North America).

Passenger rail

Amtrak long distance and commuter rail services originate from Union Station. Chicago is one of the largest hubs of passenger rail service in the nation. The services terminate in the San Francisco area, Washington, D.C., New York City, New Orleans, Portland, Seattle, Milwaukee, Quincy, St. Louis, Carbondale, Boston, Grand Rapids, Port Huron, Pontiac, Los Angeles, and San Antonio. Future services will terminate at Rockford and Moline. An attempt was made in the early 20th century to link Chicago with New York City via the Chicago – New York Electric Air Line Railroad. Parts of this were built, but it was never completed.

Bicycle and scooter sharing systems
In July 2013, the bicycle-sharing system Divvy was launched with 750 bikes and 75 docking stations It is operated by Lyft for the Chicago Department of Transportation. As of July 2019, Divvy operated 5800 bicycles at 608 stations, covering almost all of the city, excluding Pullman, Rosedale, Beverly, Belmont Cragin and Edison Park.

In May 2019, The City of Chicago announced its Chicago's Electric Shared Scooter Pilot Program, scheduled to run from June 15 to October 15. The program started on June 15 with 10 different scooter companies, including scooter sharing market leaders Bird, Jump, Lime and Lyft. Each company was allowed to bring 250 electric scooters, although both Bird and Lime claimed that they experienced a higher demand for their scooters. The program ended on October 15, with nearly 800,000 rides taken.

Freight rail
Chicago is the largest hub in the railroad industry. Six of the seven Class I railroads meet in Chicago, with the exception being the Kansas City Southern Railway. , severe freight train congestion caused trains to take as long to get through the Chicago region as it took to get there from the West Coast of the country (about 2 days). According to U.S. Department of Transportation, the volume of imported and exported goods transported via rail to, from, or through Chicago is forecast to increase nearly 150 percent between 2010 and 2040. CREATE, the Chicago Region Environmental and Transportation Efficiency Program, comprises about 70 programs, including crossovers, overpasses and underpasses, that intend to significantly improve the speed of freight movements in the Chicago area.

Airports

Chicago is served by O'Hare International Airport, the world's busiest airport measured by airline operations, on the far Northwest Side, and Midway International Airport on the Southwest Side. In 2005, O'Hare was the world's busiest airport by aircraft movements and the second-busiest by total passenger traffic. Both O'Hare and Midway are owned and operated by the City of Chicago. Gary/Chicago International Airport and Chicago Rockford International Airport, located in Gary, Indiana and Rockford, Illinois, respectively, can serve as alternative Chicago area airports, however they do not offer as many commercial flights as O'Hare and Midway. In recent years the state of Illinois has been leaning towards building an entirely new airport in the Illinois suburbs of Chicago. The City of Chicago is the world headquarters for United Airlines, the world's third-largest airline.

Port authority

The Port of Chicago consists of several major port facilities within the city of Chicago operated by the Illinois International Port District (formerly known as the Chicago Regional Port District). The central element of the Port District, Calumet Harbor, is maintained by the U.S. Army Corps of Engineers.
Includes three transit sheds totaling over  adjacent to over 900 linear meters (3,000 linear feet) of ship and barge berthing.
 Grain (14 million bushels) and bulk liquid (800,000 barrels) storage facilities along Lake Calumet.
 The Illinois International Port district also operates Foreign trade zone No. 22, which extends  from Chicago's city limits.

Utilities
Electricity for most of northern Illinois is provided by Commonwealth Edison, also known as ComEd. Their service territory borders Iroquois County to the south, the Wisconsin border to the north, the Iowa border to the west and the Indiana border to the east. In northern Illinois, ComEd (a division of Exelon) operates the greatest number of nuclear generating plants in any US state. Because of this, ComEd reports indicate that Chicago receives about 75% of its electricity from nuclear power. Recently, the city began installing wind turbines on government buildings to promote renewable energy.

Natural gas is provided by Peoples Gas, a subsidiary of Integrys Energy Group, which is headquartered in Chicago.

Domestic and industrial waste was once incinerated but it is now landfilled, mainly in the Calumet area. From 1995 to 2008, the city had a blue bag program to divert recyclable refuse from landfills. Because of low participation in the blue bag programs, the city began a pilot program for blue bin recycling like other cities. This proved successful and blue bins were rolled out across the city.

Health systems

The Illinois Medical District is on the Near West Side. It includes Rush University Medical Center, ranked as the second best hospital in the Chicago metropolitan area by U.S. News & World Report for 2014–16, the University of Illinois Medical Center at Chicago, Jesse Brown VA Hospital, and John H. Stroger Jr. Hospital of Cook County, one of the busiest trauma centers in the nation.

Two of the country's premier academic medical centers reside in Chicago, including Northwestern Memorial Hospital and the University of Chicago Medical Center. The Chicago campus of Northwestern University includes the Feinberg School of Medicine; Northwestern Memorial Hospital, which is ranked as the best hospital in the Chicago metropolitan area by U.S. News & World Report for 2017–18; the Shirley Ryan AbilityLab (formerly named the Rehabilitation Institute of Chicago), which is ranked the best U.S. rehabilitation hospital by U.S. News & World Report; the new Prentice Women's Hospital; and Ann & Robert H. Lurie Children's Hospital of Chicago.

The University of Illinois College of Medicine at UIC is the second largest medical school in the United States (2,600 students including those at campuses in Peoria, Rockford and Urbana–Champaign).

In addition, the Chicago Medical School and Loyola University Chicago's Stritch School of Medicine are located in the suburbs of North Chicago and Maywood, respectively. The Midwestern University Chicago College of Osteopathic Medicine is in Downers Grove.

The American Medical Association, Accreditation Council for Graduate Medical Education, Accreditation Council for Continuing Medical Education, American Osteopathic Association, American Dental Association, Academy of General Dentistry, Academy of Nutrition and Dietetics, American Association of Nurse Anesthetists, American College of Surgeons, American Society for Clinical Pathology, American College of Healthcare Executives, the American Hospital Association and Blue Cross and Blue Shield Association are all based in Chicago.

Sister cities

Chicago has 28 sister cities around the world. Like Chicago, many of them are the main city of a country that has had large numbers of immigrants settle in Chicago. These relationships have sought to promote economic, cultural, educational, and other ties.

To celebrate the sister cities, Chicago hosts a yearly festival in Daley Plaza, which features cultural acts and food tastings from the other cities. In addition, the Chicago Sister Cities program hosts a number of delegation and formal exchanges. In some cases, these exchanges have led to further informal collaborations, such as the academic relationship between the Buehler Center on Aging, Health & Society at the Feinberg School of Medicine of Northwestern University and the Institute of Gerontology of Ukraine (originally of the Soviet Union), that was originally established as part of the Chicago-Kyiv sister cities program.

Sister cities

 Warsaw (Poland) 1960
 Milan (Italy) 1973
 Osaka (Japan) 1973
 Casablanca (Morocco) 1982
 Shanghai (China) 1985
 Shenyang (China) 1985
 Gothenburg (Sweden) 1987
 Accra (Ghana) 1989
 Prague (Czech Republic) 1990
 Kyiv (Ukraine) 1991
 Mexico City (Mexico) 1991
 Toronto (Canada) 1991
 Birmingham (United Kingdom) 1993
 Vilnius (Lithuania) 1993
 Hamburg (Germany) 1994
 Petah Tikva (Israel) 1994
 Paris (France) 1996 (friendship and cooperation agreement only)
 Athens (Greece) 1997
 Durban (South Africa) 1997
 Galway (Ireland) 1997
 Moscow (Russia) 1997 (Suspended)
 Lucerne (Switzerland) 1998
 Delhi (India) 2001
 Amman (Jordan) 2004
 Belgrade (Serbia) 2005
 São Paulo (Brazil) 2007
 Lahore (Pakistan) 2007
 Busan (South Korea) 2007
 Bogotá (Colombia) 2009
 City of Sydney (Australia) February 21, 2019 (The City of Sydney considers the City of Chicago a "friendship city", while the City of Chicago considers the City of Sydney a "sister city.")

See also
 Chicago area water quality
 Chicago Wilderness
 Gentrification of Chicago
 List of cities with the most skyscrapers
 List of people from Chicago
 List of fiction set in Chicago
 National Register of Historic Places listings in Central Chicago
 National Register of Historic Places listings in North Side Chicago
 National Register of Historic Places listings in West Side Chicago
 USS Chicago, 4 ships

Explanatory notes

Citations

General and cited references

External links

 
 Choose Chicago—Official tourism website
 Chicago History
 Maps of Chicago from the American Geographical Society Library
 
 Chicago – LocalWiki Local Chicago Wiki
 
 
 

 
1833 establishments in Illinois
Populated places established in 1833
Articles containing video clips
Cities in Cook County, Illinois
Cities in DuPage County, Illinois
Cities in the Chicago metropolitan area
Cities in Illinois
County seats in Illinois
Inland port cities and towns of the United States
Populated places established in the 1780s
Illinois populated places on Lake Michigan
Railway towns in Illinois
Majority-minority cities and towns in Cook County, Illinois
Majority-minority cities and towns in DuPage County, Illinois